This non-exhaustive list contains many of the sub-fields within the field of psychology:

 Abnormal psychology
 Analytical psychology
 Animal psychology
 Anomalistic psychology
 Applied behavior analysis
 Applied psychology
 Asian psychology
 Behavioral psychology
 Behavioral genetics
 Behavioral medicine
 Biopsychology
 Black psychology
 Cognitive neuropsychology
 Cognitive psychology
 Community psychology
 Comparative psychology
 Clinical behavior analysis
 Clinical psychology
 Consumer psychology
 Counseling psychology
 Criminal psychology
 Critical psychology
 Cross-cultural psychology
 Cultural neuroscience
 Cultural psychology
 Cyberpsychology
 Developmental psychology
 Differential psychology
 Discursive psychology
 Ecological psychology
 Economic psychology
 Educational psychology
 Engineering psychology
 Environmental psychology
 Evolutionary psychology
 Experimental analysis of behavior
 Experimental psychology
 Filipino psychology
 Forensic psychology
 Health psychology
 Humanistic psychology
 Imaginal psychology
 Indian psychology
 Indigenous psychology
 Individual differences psychology
 Industrial and organizational psychology
 International psychology
 Investigative psychology
 Legal psychology
 Mathematical psychology
 Media psychology
 Medical psychology
 Military psychology
 Moral psychology
 Music psychology
 Neuropsychology
 Occupational health psychology
 Parapsychology
 Peace psychology
 Performance psychology
 Personality psychology
 Philosophy of psychology
 Physiological psychology
 Police psychology
 Political psychology
 Positive psychology
 Pre- and perinatal psychology
 Problem solving
 Psychoanalysis
 Psychohistory
 Psycholinguistics
 Psychology and law
 Psychology of art
 Psychology of eating meat
 Psychology of religion
 Psychometrics
 Psychonomics
 Psycho-oncology
 Psychopathology
 Psychopharmacology
 Psychophysics
 Psychophysiology
 Psychotherapy
 Quantitative psychology
 Social psychology
 Sports psychology
 Systems psychology
 Theoretical psychology
 Traffic psychology
 Transpersonal psychology

See also
 List of psychology topics

Disciplines, list of